Hajipur is a village and mandal in the Mancherial District of Telangana State in India.

Administration divisions 
There are 21 villages in Hajipur.

References 

Villages in Mancherial district
Mandal headquarters in Mancherial district